The 1990 Matchroom International League was a professional non-ranking snooker tournament that was played from January to May 1990.

Tony Meo topped the table and won the tournament.
 


League phase

If points were level then match wins, followed by most frames won determined their positions. If two players had an identical record then the result in their match determined their positions. If that ended 4–4 then the player who got to four first was higher.

 17 January – Paris
 Jimmy White 5–3 Steve Davis
 25 January – Frankfurt
 Tony Meo 5–3 Steve Davis
 1 February – Reykjavík
 Alex Higgins 4–4 Steve Davis
 17 February – Turku 
 Tony Meo 5–3 Alex Higgins
 18 March – Zwolle
 Terry Griffiths 7–1 Alex Higgins

Unknown dates
 Switel Hotel, Antwerp
 Jimmy White 5–3 Alex Higgins
 Steve Davis 4–4 Terry Griffiths
Marriott Hotel, Munich
 Jimmy White 6–2 Mike Hallett
Cafe Winker, Salzburg
 Jimmy White 4–4 Terry Griffiths
Algarve
 Steve Davis 6–2 Mike Hallett
Vigo
 Terry Griffiths 6–2 Mike Hallett
 Mijas
 Tony Meo 5–3 Jimmy White
 Tony Meo 4–4 Terry Griffiths
 Tony Meo 8–0 Mike Hallett
 Mike Hallett 6–2 Alex Higgins

References

Premier League Snooker
1990 in snooker
1990 in British sport